Emmanuel Jérôme Kundé (born 15 July 1956) is a Cameroonian former professional footballer who played as a defender. He spent the majority of his professional career playing for Canon Yaoundé. He was also a member of the Cameroon national team at the World Cups of 1982 and 1990, and won the 1984 and 1988 African Nations Cups.

Kundé scored the winning goal in the 1988 African Nations Cup final against Nigeria with a penalty kick. Two years later, in the 1990 World Cup quarterfinal match against England, he scored to equalize the score 1–1, again via a penalty kick. He also took part in 1992 African Nations Cup while playing for Olympic Mvolyé.

Honours

Club
Canon Yaoundé
Cameroon Championship: 1982, 1985, 1986
Cameroonian Cup: 1983
African Cup Winners' Cup: Runner-up 1984

Prévoyance Yaoundé
Cameroonian Cup: 1990

Olympic Mvolyé
Cameroonian Cup: 1992

International
Africa Cup of Nations: 1984, 1980; Runner-up 1986

Manager
Currently Coach: 2020 - Hémlè Football Club De Botko- www.hemle.org
Coupe du Gabon: 1999, 2003 (with US Bitam)
Coupe du Gabon: 1999, 2003 (with US Bitam)

See also
 List of men's footballers with 100 or more international caps

References

External links
 
 

1956 births
Living people
Association football defenders
Cameroonian footballers
Cameroonian expatriate footballers
Cameroon international footballers
Expatriate footballers in France
Cameroonian expatriate sportspeople in France
Canon Yaoundé players
Stade Lavallois players
Stade de Reims players
Olympic Mvolyé players
Ligue 1 players
Ligue 2 players
Olympic footballers of Cameroon
Footballers at the 1984 Summer Olympics
1982 FIFA World Cup players
1990 FIFA World Cup players
1982 African Cup of Nations players
1984 African Cup of Nations players
1986 African Cup of Nations players
1988 African Cup of Nations players
1990 African Cup of Nations players
1992 African Cup of Nations players
Africa Cup of Nations-winning players
FIFA Century Club